Biscutella rotgesii is a species of flowering plant in the family Brassicaceae. It is found only in Corsica, France. Its natural habitat is Mediterranean-type shrubby vegetation. It is threatened by habitat loss.

References

External links
Photo at ARKive.org website

rotgesii
Flora of Corsica
Critically endangered plants
Taxonomy articles created by Polbot